The following list of Alaska Native inventors and scientists begins to document Alaska Natives with deep historical and ecological knowledge about system-wide health, knowledge that in many cases precedes and exceeds discoveries published in the scientific literature.

For more than century, Alaska Native naturalists have entered into collaborative relationships with scientists working in the field or in their communities (International Polar Year (IPY), Native Contributions to Arctic Science, Barrow Arctic Research Center). Their many contributions extend from indigenous ways of knowing to practical and applied inventions needed to subsist from the land, air, and waters (Sharing Knowledge Smithsonian Exhibit).

As institutions strive to decolonize, indigenous-settler relationships remain contentious and marked by structural inequities. In the history of the New World, Old World explorers and settlers often relied for their survival on the knowledge and wisdom of indigenous peoples.

While this list focuses on individual biographies, it is worth noting the many exemplary collaborative projects (e.g., Barrow Arctic Research Center). In addition to recognizing community-based participatory research (CBPR), this list credits the organizations that develop and advocate for the education of future indigenous scientists and engineers, young scholars who will increase the number of indigenous scientists and engineers earning degrees. According to a 2019 report from the National Center for Science and Engineering Statistics, fewer than 1% of bachelor’s degrees in science and engineering programs go to American Indian, Alaska Native, Native Hawaiian, or other Pacific Islanders. These organizations include American Indian Science and Engineering Society (AISES) and Alaska Native Science and Engineering Program (ANSEP).

Inventors and scientists

Native science organizations
Sitka Tribe
Yukon River Inter-Tribal Watershed Council
Native American Research Center for Health

See also
Traditional Alaska Native Medicine
Traditional Ecological Knowledge
Traditional Knowledge

References

Resources 
Brower, H., & Brewster, K. (2004). The whales, they give themselves: Conversations with Harry Brower, Sr (No. 4). Univ of Alaska Pr.
Eben Hopson Memorial Archives: Celebrate the life and leadership of the late Eben Hopson
Sea Ice Project Jukebox (This project includes oral history recordings of residents of northern Alaska talking about sea ice conditions, observations over time, and changes that are occurring. The collection includes archival interviews recorded from 1978 to 1980 as part of a study related to potential offshore oil development, and from 2008-2009 as part of a Geophysics Ph.D. project about sea ice thickness along spring whaling trails offshore of Utqiaġvik (Barrow)).
Sturm, M. (2002). Fifty More Years below Zero: Tributes and Meditations for the Naval Arctic Research Laboratory's First Half Century.

Alaska Native inventors and scientists
inventors and scientists